"Every Breath You Take" is a song by the English rock band the Police from their album Synchronicity (1983). Written by Sting, the single was the biggest US and Canadian hit of 1983, topping the Billboard Hot 100 singles chart for eight weeks (the band's only  hit on that chart), and the Canadian RPM Chart for four weeks. Their fifth UK No. 1, it topped the UK Singles Chart for four weeks. The song also reached the Top 10 in numerous other countries.

At the 26th Annual Grammy Awards, the song was nominated for three Grammy Awards, including Song of the Year, Best Pop Performance by a Duo or Group with Vocals, and Record of the Year, winning in the first two categories. For the song, Sting received the 1983 Ivor Novello Award for Best Song Musically and Lyrically from the British Academy of Songwriters, Composers and Authors.

"Every Breath You Take" is the Police's and Sting's signature song, and in 2010 was estimated to generate between a quarter and a third of Sting's music publishing income. In May 2019, it was recognised by BMI as being the most played song in radio history. With nearly 15 million radio plays, Sting received a BMI Award at a ceremony held at the Beverly Wilshire Hotel in Beverly Hills to mark it being the Most Performed Song in BMI's catalogue, a distinction previously held since 1999 by Spector, Mann and Weill's "You've Lost That Lovin' Feelin'. BMI President and CEO Mike O'Neill stated: "For the first time in 22 years, BMI has a new top song in our repertoire with Sting's timeless hit 'Every Breath You Take,' a remarkable achievement that solidifies its place in songwriting history."

In the 1983 Rolling Stone critics' and readers' poll, it was voted "Song of the Year". In the US, it was the best-selling single of 1983 and fifth-best-selling single of the decade. Billboard ranked it as the  song for 1983. The song ranked  on the Rolling Stone list of the 500 Greatest Songs of All Time and is included in The Rock and Roll Hall of Fame's 500 Songs that Shaped Rock and Roll. It also ranked number 25 on Billboards Hot 100 All-Time Top Songs. In 2008, Q magazine named it among the top 10 British Songs of the 1980s. In 2015, the song was voted by the British public as The Nation's Favourite 1980s number one in a UK-wide poll for ITV.

Origins and songwriting
Sting wrote the song in 1982 in the aftermath of his separation from Frances Tomelty and the beginning of his relationship with Trudie Styler. Their split was controversial. As The Independent reported in 2006, "The problem was, he was already married – to actress Frances Tomelty, who just happened to be Trudie's best friend. Sting and Frances lived next door to Trudie in Bayswater, West London, for several years before the two of them became lovers. The affair was widely condemned."

To escape the public eye, Sting retreated to the Caribbean. He started writing the song at Ian Fleming's writing desk on the Goldeneye estate in Oracabessa, Jamaica. The lyrics are the words of a possessive lover who is watching "every breath you take; every move you make". Sting recalled:

Sting later said he was disconcerted by how many people think the song is more positive than it is. He insists it is about the obsession with a lost lover, and the jealousy and surveillance that follow. "One couple told me 'Oh we love that song; it was the main song played at our wedding!' I thought, 'Well, good luck.'" When asked why he appears angry in the music video, Sting told BBC Radio 2, "I think the song is very, very sinister and ugly and people have actually misinterpreted it as being a gentle little love song, when it's quite the opposite. Hence so." Gary T. Marx, sociologist and scholar of surveillance studies, wrote in 1988 that, while the song was "a love rather than a protest song", it "nicely captures elements of the new surveillance". He compared the lines to various new technologies of surveillance, including linking "every breath you take" to breath analyzers, "every step you take" to ankle monitors, and "every vow you break" to voice stress analysis.

According to the Back to Mono box-set book, "Every Breath You Take" is influenced by a Gene Pitney song titled "Every Breath I Take". Led Zeppelin's song, "D'yer Mak'er" (1973), also contains the words "every breath I take; every move I make".

The demo of the song was recorded in an eight-track suite in North London's Utopia studios and featured Sting singing over a Hammond organ. A few months later, he presented the song to the other band members when they reconvened at George Martin's AIR Studios in Montserrat to work on the Synchronicity album. The band initially tried the song in a variety of different styles and arrangements, such as reggae.

While recording, guitarist Andy Summers came up with a guitar part inspired by Béla Bartók that would later become a trademark lick, and played it straight through in one take. He was asked to put guitar onto a simple backing track of bass, drums, and a single vocal, with Sting offering no directive beyond "make it your own". Summers remembered:

The recording process was fraught with difficulties as personal tensions between the band members, particularly Sting and drummer Stewart Copeland, came to the fore. Producer Hugh Padgham claimed that by the time of the recording sessions, Sting and Copeland "hated each other", with verbal and physical fights in the studio common. The tensions almost led to the recording sessions being cancelled until a meeting involving the band and the group's manager, Miles Copeland (Stewart's brother), resulted in an agreement to continue.

The drum track was largely created through separate overdubs of each percussive instrument, with the kick drum coming from the sample-based Oberheim DMX drum machine while the main backbeat was created by simultaneously playing a snare and a gong drum. To give the song more liveliness, Padgham asked Copeland to record his drum part in the studio's dining room in order to achieve some "special sound effects". The room, however, was so hot that Copeland's drum sticks had to be taped to his hands to avoid slippage.

A piano accompaniment consisting of individual notes was added to complete the song's bridge. Padgham remembers that the band and he had "agonized over that part for a long time". with Sting "fiddling around on the piano, banging away on the same note". Padgham recalled a one-note guitar solo and its hypnotic effect in previous work with XTC, and suggested using a similar single-note piano accompaniment - concluding that the one-note line was "kind of his idea in the end". In a 1984 interview Padgham remembered Sting coming into the studio with a couple of one-note piano lines for the song - instead implying that they were Sting's ideas and not his.

Cash Box (incorrectly) described the song as "a subtley crafted minor key ballad"  and commented on the effect of the "surprising, smokey smooth feel [of the vocal] above the band's patently insistent rhythmic drive."

Music video 
The song had a music video (directed by duo Godley & Creme) loosely based on Gjon Mili's 1944 short film Jammin' the Blues. Shot in black-and-white with a navy blue tint, the video depicts the band, accompanied by a pianist and string section, performing the song in a darkened ballroom as a man washes the floor-to-ceiling window behind them. Sting performs his part on upright bass rather than bass guitar.

The video was praised for its cinematography; MTV (1999), Rolling Stone (1993), and VH1 (2001) named it one of the best music videos ever, placing it 16th, 61st, & 33rd in their respective top 100 lists. Daniel Pearl won the first MTV cinematography award for his work on the video. Released in the early days of MTV, "Every Breath You Take" was one of the earliest videos to enter heavy rotation, a fact that significantly contributed to the popularity of the song. Pop star Richard Marx remembers that "the first video I watched over and over was 'Every Breath You Take'. It was like seeing a Bergman film. Directors usually spelled out every word of the lyrics in a video, but this was the first video I knew that didn't do that. It was abstract." According to A&M co-founder Jeff Ayeroff, "[The video for] 'Every Breath You Take' probably cost $75,000 to $100,000, and we sold over 5 million albums. With a good video, the return on your investment was phenomenal."

On October 5, 2022, Billboard officially released a statement confirming that the music video for "Every Breath You Take" surpassed one billion views on YouTube.

Commercial performance
"Every Breath You Take" was released as a single in 1983, with "Murder by Numbers", a composition by Summers and Sting, on the B-side. It reached No. 1 in the United Kingdom, the United States, Canada, Israel, Ireland, and South Africa.  In Canada, it spent four weeks at No. 1 and an additional six weeks at No. 2.  It also reached No. 2 in Spain, Sweden, Norway and Australia, while reaching the Top 10 in most other Western, Northern and Southern European countries.

In the 1983 Rolling Stone critics and readers poll, it was voted "Song of the Year". In the US, it was the best-selling single of 1983 and fifth-best-selling single of the decade. Billboard ranked it as the  song for 1983.

The single became the biggest US and Canadian hit of 1983, topping the Billboard Hot 100 singles chart for eight weeks (the band's only  hit on that chart). It also topped the Billboard Top Tracks chart for nine weeks.

At the 26th Annual Grammy Awards, the song was nominated for three Grammy Awards, including Song of the Year, Best Pop Performance by a Duo or Group with Vocals, and Record of the Year, winning in the first two categories. Sting received the 1983 Ivor Novello award for Best Song Musically and Lyrically from the British Academy of Songwriters, Composers and Authors.

Legacy 
Two cover versions charted on the Billboard Hot Country Singles chart in 1983: Rich Landers at number 68 and Mason Dixon at number 69.

In 1999, "Every Breath You Take" was listed as one of the Top 100 Songs of the Century by BMI. In May 2019, BMI updated the list and “Every Breath You Take” was recognized as the Most Performed Song in BMI’s catalogue, a distinction previously held by "You've Lost That Lovin' Feelin'. In 2003, VH1 ranked the song the No. 2 greatest breakup song. As of 2003, Sting was making an average of $2000 per day in royalties for the song.

In October 2007, Sting was awarded a Million-Air certificate for nine million airplays of "Every Breath You Take" at the BMI Awards show in London.

"Every Breath You Take" is the Police's and Sting's signature song, and in 2010 was estimated to generate between a quarter and a third of Sting's music publishing income. In May 2019, it was recognized by BMI as being the most played song in radio history. With nearly 15 million radio plays, Sting received a BMI Award at a ceremony held at the Beverly Wilshire Hotel in Beverly Hills to mark it being the Most Performed Song in BMI's catalogue, a distinction previously held since 1999 by "You've Lost That Lovin' Feelin'. BMI President and CEO Mike O'Neill stated: "For the first time in 22 years, BMI has a new top song in our repertoire with Sting's timeless hit 'Every Breath You Take,' a remarkable achievement that solidifies its place in songwriting history."

The song ranked  on the Rolling Stone list of the 500 Greatest Songs of All Time and is included in The Rock and Roll Hall of Fame's 500 Songs that Shaped Rock and Roll. It also ranked number 25 on Billboards Hot 100 All-Time Top Songs. In 2008, Q magazine named it among the top 10 British Songs of the 1980s. In 2015, the song was voted by the British public as the nation's favourite 1980s number one in a UK-wide poll for ITV.

The song is sampled in Puff Daddy's 1997 hit "I'll Be Missing You," which topped the Billboard Hot 100 for 11 weeks and won a Grammy Award for Best Rap Performance by a Duo or Group; Sting ultimately participated in a performance of "I'll Be Missing You" at the 1997 MTV Video Music Awards.

According to Copeland:

Accolades
It is one of The Rock and Roll Hall of Fame's Songs that Shaped Rock and Roll. On the 50th anniversary of the Billboard Hot 100 Chart, the song was ranked No. 25 on Billboards "The All-Time Top 100 Songs" chart.

 Track listing 7" single: A&M / AM 117 "Every Breath You Take" – 3:56
 "Murder by Numbers" – 4:31Two-disc 7" single: A&M / AM 117'
Disc one
 "Every Breath You Take" – 4:13
 "Murder by Numbers" – 4:31
Disc two
 "Truth Hits Everybody" (Remix) – 3:34
 "Man in a Suitcase" (Live) – 2:18

Personnel
Sting – lead and backing vocals, bass guitar, piano, synthesizers
Andy Summers – guitars
Stewart Copeland – drums, Oberheim DMX

Charts

Weekly charts

Year-end charts

Decade-end charts

All-time charts

Certifications and sales

See also
List of RPM number-one singles of 1983
List of number-one singles of 1983 (Ireland)
List of number-one singles from the 1980s (UK)
List of Billboard Hot 100 number-one singles of 1983
List of number-one mainstream rock hits (United States)
Monorhyme

Notes

References

External links
 Classic Tracks: The Police's 'Every Breath You Take'

1983 songs
1983 singles
The Police songs
A&M Records singles
Black-and-white music videos
Billboard Hot 100 number-one singles
Cashbox number-one singles
Grammy Award for Song of the Year
Irish Singles Chart number-one singles
Number-one singles in Israel
Number-one singles in South Africa
Music videos directed by Godley and Creme
Mason Dixon (band) songs
RPM Top Singles number-one singles
Song recordings produced by Hugh Padgham
Songs written by Sting (musician)
UK Singles Chart number-one singles
Songs about stalking
Songs about jealousy